One PNC Plaza is a high-rise office building located in the Golden Triangle neighborhood of the Central Business District of Pittsburgh, Pennsylvania, United States.  Constructed in 1972, it is   30 stories.  It houses the general offices for PNC Financial Services. The building is the former location of PNC's corporate headquarters before completion of the Tower at PNC Plaza.

The building was constructed on the site of the former First National Bank Building, a 26-story 1912 beaux-arts tower, that was only  shorter.

See also 
 List of tallest buildings in Pittsburgh

References

Further reading

Skyscraper office buildings in Pittsburgh
Bank buildings in Pennsylvania
Pittsburgh metropolitan area
Bank company headquarters in the United States
Office buildings completed in 1972
1972 establishments in Pennsylvania
Welton Becket buildings